The geography of Malaysia includes both the physical and the human geography of Malaysia, a Southeast Asian country made up of two major landmasses separated by water—Peninsular Malaysia to the west and East Malaysia to the east—and numerous smaller islands that surround those landmasses. Peninsular Malaysia is on the southernmost part of the Malay Peninsula, south of Thailand, north of Singapore and east of the Indonesian island of Sumatra; East Malaysia comprises most of the northern part of Borneo island, and shares land borders with Brunei to the north and Indonesian Borneo to the south.

Climate

Located near the equator, Malaysia's climate is categorised as equatorial, being hot and humid throughout the year. The climates of the Peninsula and the East differ, as the climate on the peninsula is directly affected by wind from the mainland, as opposed to the more maritime weather of the East. Malaysia is exposed to the El Niño effect, which reduces rainfall in the dry season. Climate change is likely to have a significant effect on Malaysia, increasing sea levels and rainfall, increasing flooding risks and leading to large droughts.

Malaysia faces two monsoon winds seasons, the Southwest Monsoon from late May to September, and the Northeast Monsoon from October to March. The Northeast Monsoon brings in more rainfall compared to the Southwest Monsoon, originating in China and the north Pacific. The southwest monsoon originates from the deserts of Australia. March and October form transitions between the two monsoons.

Local climates are affected by the presence of mountain ranges throughout Malaysia, and climate can be divided into that of the highlands, the lowlands, and coastal regions. The lowlands have a similar temperature, but follow a more distinctive rainfall pattern and show very high humidity levels. The highlands are cooler and wetter, and display a greater temperature variation. A large amount of cloud cover is present over the highlands, which have humidity levels that do not fall below 75%.

The driest place in Malaysia is in Sitiawan, Perak with average rainfall of only  a year.

Climate change

Geology

Malaysia is located on the Sunda shelf, and is tectonically inactive. The oldest rocks in the country date from 540 million years ago, and are mostly sedimentary. The most common kind of rock is limestone that formed during the Paleozoic Era. Limestone that had accreted in East Malaysia during the Tertiary period later eroded, forming basins of sedimentary rocks that are rich in oil and natural gas. The mountain ranges in Malaysia were formed through orogenesis beginning in the Mesozoic era.

It is the only country to contain land on both mainland Asia and the Malay archipelago. From the total land area,  or 0.37% is made up of water such as lakes, rivers, or other internal waters.

Malaysia has the 29th longest coastline in the world. The two distinct parts of Malaysia, separated from each other by the South China Sea, share a largely similar landscape in that both West (Peninsular) and East Malaysia feature coastal plains rising to hills and mountains.

About half of Peninsular Malaysia is covered by granite and other igneous rocks, a third more is covered by stratified rocks older than the granite, and the remainder is covered by alluvium.

Harbours are only available on the peninsula's western side, and the most fertile land occurs when river valleys flow out to the sea. The coastal plains bordering the straits of Malacca are the most densely populated areas of Malaysia, and contains Malaysia's capital, Kuala Lumpur.

It is divided between coastal regions, hills and valleys, and a mountainous interior. There are only two major cities, Kuching and Kota Kinabalu. Much of southern Sarawak is coastal lowlands, which shifts to a series of plateaus going north, ending in the mountainous regions of Sabah.

Mountain ranges

The highest mountain range in Malaysia is the Crocker Range in Sabah, which divides the state in half. This range includes Mount Kinabalu, the highest mountain in the country, as well as Mount Tambuyukon, the third highest in the country. Mount Kinabalu is 55% (by  margin) taller than Mount Trusmadi, Malaysia's second tallest mountain.

Mountain ranges in the East tend to follow north–south or northeast–southwest paths, and the highest ranges form the border between Malaysia and Indonesia. The mountains contain many jagged limestone peaks. The Trus Madi Range, also in Sabah, houses Mount Trus Madi. Bombalai Hill in Sabah is the only active volcano in Malaysia.

Peninsular Malaysia contains numerous mountain ranges running parallel from north to south along the peninsula. The main mountain range is the Titiwangsa Mountains, which divides the peninsula between its east and west coasts. It houses Mount Korbu, the second highest peak in the Peninsular. These mountains are heavily forested, and mainly composed of granite. The range is the origin of some of Peninsular Malaysia's river systems. To the east of this range is the Bintang Range. The highest peak in the Peninsular is Mount Tahan, located on the Tahan Range.

Caves

Numerous caves run through the country due to the karst landscape caused by water eroding limestone. The Mulu Caves in East Malaysia are the largest caves in the world. They are located between the Penambo range and Brunei, and form a major tourist attraction. Other famous caves are the  Deer Cave and Lang's Cave.

Islands

It is followed by Betruit Island in Sarawak, Langkawi in Kedah, and Penang Island in Penang. The largest island shared with another country is Borneo, followed by Sebatik Island. In addition, Malaysia lies within the world's coral reef distribution. The reefs can be usually found around islands such as Sipadan Island, Swallow Reef, and Redang Island. Sipadan Island, an underwater mountain, is Malaysia's only oceanic island.

Coasts
A recent global remote sensing analysis suggested that there were 1,713 km2 of tidal flats in Malaysia, making it the 19th ranked country in terms of how much tidal flat occurs there.

Forests

Malaysian forests can be categorised as tropical rainforest. Approximately 58.2% of Malaysian land is covered by forest. East Malaysia, like most of Borneo, was formerly covered with Borneo lowland rain forests with over 2000 tree species. However, much of it has been cleared, due to the increase in logging since the 1960s and the increase of shifting cultivation. Over 80% of Sarawak's forests have been felled, and the logging throughout East Malaysia has polluted waterways, increased erosion, and damaged agriculture. Some state governments have now taken measures to halt the degradation of the rainforest.

Malaysia's rainforest's are made of a variety of types, mainly dipterocarp, swamps, and mangroves. The majority of the forest is dipterocarp forests. Dipterocarps species are centred in Malaysia. Some areas are designated as forest reserves, state parks, or national parks. The management of these reserves as under control of the Department of Wildlife and National Park, the Forest Department of Sarawak, the Sabah Forestry Department, Sabah Foundation, and Sabah Parks. As of 2000, there are two World Heritage Sites under the natural category – Kinabalu National Park and Gunung Mulu National Park.

Ecoregions

Malaysia is divided into several tropical forest ecoregions.

Peninsular Malaysia is home to the Peninsular Malaysian rain forests, Peninsular Malaysian montane rain forests, Peninsular Malaysian peat swamp forests, and Tenasserim-South Thailand semi-evergreen rain forests.

Eastern Malaysia is home to the Borneo lowland rain forests, Borneo montane rain forests, Borneo peat swamp forests, Southwest Borneo freshwater swamp forests, and Sundaland heath forests.

Peninsular Malaysia's west coast is home to the Myanmar Coast mangroves. The Indochina mangroves fringe Peninsular Malaysia's east coast. The Sunda Shelf mangroves line Borneo's coast.

Extreme points
The southernmost point of Malaysia is located in the district of Serian in Sarawak. Tanjung Piai on the southern tip of Johor is the southernmost point in Peninsular, and thus of the whole of continental Eurasia. The easternmost point is found on the tip of Dent Peninsular in Lahad Datu district in Sabah. The northernmost point is found on the northern tip of Banggi Island. The westernmost point is Perak Island, a sandstone rock which is part of Kedah state that rises at the center of Strait of Malacca.

Bodies of water

Between Peninsular Malaysia and East Malaysia is the South China Sea, the largest body of water around Malaysia. Facing the western coast of Peninsular Malaysia there is the Straits of Malacca towards the south, and the Andaman Sea towards the north. The Strait of Malacca, lying between Sumatra and Peninsular Malaysia, is arguably the most important shipping lane in the world. These seas are marginal seas of the Indian Ocean.

Off the east coast of Peninsular Malaysia is the South China Sea, while a small part in the north lies within the Gulf of Thailand. These form part of the marginal seas of the Pacific Ocean. The Straits of Johor off the south of Peninsular acts as a maritime border of Malaysia and Singapore. In East Malaysia, the western coasts of Sabah and Sarawak faces the South China Sea. The northeast coast of Sabah faces the Sulu Sea, while the southeast coast of Sabah faces the Celebes Sea.

Malaysia claims 12 nm as its territorial waters, which extend into the Coral Triangle. It also has an exclusive economic zone of  based on  nautical miles from its coastal baseline. Malaysia claims  in the depth of the continental shelf or to the depth of exploration within the area below the South China Sea known as Sundaland. The territorial claim for the Straits of Malacca is shared between Malaysia and Indonesia in accordance to a treaty signed in 1970 known as the Treaty Between the Republic of Indonesia and Malaysia on Determination of boundary Lines of Territorial Waters of the two Nations at the Strait of Malacca.

Lakes

The Bera Lake in Pahang is one of the largest lakes in Malaysia, and one of the only two natural lakes in Malaysia with Chini Lake.
is the largest artificial lake in Southeast Asia.

Rivers

There are many systems of rivers found around in Malaysia.

Wildlife

Malaysia is a megadiverse country, with a high number of species and high levels of endemism. These forests contain the Rafflesia, the largest flower in the world. The clearing of the Borneo lowland rain forests has caused wildlife to retreat into the upland rain forests inland.

Natural disasters
Malaysia's geographical location protects the country from most major natural disasters. It is located on a seismically stable plate that minimises direct risks of earthquakes and volcanoes, is partially protected from tsunamis by surrounding landmasses, and is a rare target for tropical cyclones. However, the country's tropical climate opens the country to the risk of flooding, landslides and prolonged droughts. Global climate change may exacerbate the situation with extreme weather events in Southeast Asia raising the economic, political and social risks for Malaysia.

Storms and flooding

With 189 water basins and an average rainfall of over 2000–4000 mm per year, Malaysia is prone to riverine, muddy floods that range from hours-long flash floods, to prolonged flooding on flat, low-lying land along major tributaries and main stems. 15 instances of major flooding in the region have occurred since 1926; notable floods include the 1971 floods in and around Kuala Lumpur that killed 32, affected 180,000 and prompted the launch of flood control projects in the city, 2006 and 2007 floods in Johor that resulted in the loss of 18 lives and RM1.5 billion in damages in addition to the temporary displacement of 110,000 people, and major flooding centered around the Klang Valley in 2021–2022 that led to 54 fatalities, at least RM5.3–6.5 billion in damages and 125,490 displaced. Flooding has been a major concern in recent decades due to rapid development in river catchment areas that has led to increased surface and river runoffs, increased sediment buildup in rivers, and frequent erosion along river banks.

Due to weak Coriolis forces from its close proximity to the equator, direct passages of tropical cyclones are rare for the country despite its proximity to the highly active Northwestern Pacific tropical cyclone basin. The only tropical cyclones to significantly affect Malaysia since records began were Tropical Storm Greg in 1996 and Tropical Storm Vamei in 2001; the former's passage over Sabah remains the deadliest tropical storm in the country's history, with 238 dead and 102 missing. However, tropical depressions as well as outlying storm patterns generated by passing cyclones have made landfall regularly, often leading to abnormally high rainfall and flooding, such as the tail of Typhoon Lekima striking the Malay Peninsula in August 2018, and the path of 2021's Tropical Depression 29W across central Peninsular Malaysia contributing to record precipitation and protracted flooding in the region between December 2021 and January 2022.

Seismic activity

Malaysia is largely seismically stable with little modern history of volcanic activity, being situated entirely on the Sunda tectonic plate, between two major boundaries of the Australian Plate and Eurasian Plate in the west of Peninsular Malaysia, and the Philippine Sea Plate and Eurasian Plate at Bornean Malaysia.

Peninsular Malaysia is more accustomed to only light tremors caused by earthquakes along the Sumatran islands of Indonesia generated predominantly by the Great Sumatran fault and Sunda megathrust. However, a pair of rare earthquakes that did not originate in Sumatra were felt in much of Malaya and Singapore on 31 January 1922 and 7 February 1922. As is with Singapore, the effects of tremors are also felt more significantly on skyscrapers common in populated centres in Malaysia due to the effects of mechanical resonance. Borneon states, particularly Sabah, are at risk of more moderate interplate and intraplate earthquakes due to its closer proximity to active tectonic activities along the Ring of Fire, with record earthquakes in the country occurring in Sabah in 1923, 1951, 1976 and 2015 at an average of 6.0–6.5 Mw. The fringes of Sabah also lay host to a series of the country's only volcanoes at the Tawau volcanic field and off the state's coast. Prominently, Mount Bombalai last erupted during the Holocene epoch, while the last major eruption in present-day Malaysia occurred during the formation of a chain of high islands (prominently including Pulau Tiga) off Kimanis Bay in 1897.

Interest towards tsunami risks to Malaysia has also heighten since the 2004 Indian Ocean earthquake. Although the western coast of Peninsular Malaysia was largely shielded by the Sumatran island from the full effects of waves generated by the earthquake, weaker deflected tsunami waves led to damage and casualties along the northwestern coast of Peninsular Malaysia, affecting coastal Perlis, Kedah, Penang and Perak. The disaster also highlights the risk of further tsunamis that may strike coasts in direct line of undersea faults, primarily around the South China Sea.

Natural resources

Minerals and petroleum
Malaysia produces petroleum and is a net exporter. Malaysia also produces liquefied natural gas as well as various other related products, most of which are found off the coasts of Terengganu, Sabah, and Sarawak. Among other notable natural resources includes tin, timber, copper, iron, ore, and bauxite.

Malaysia was the largest exporter of tin until the industry-wide collapse in the 1980s. Tin deposits are found in areas in Selangor, Kinta valley in Perak, Pahang and Johor. There are significant deposit of gold in Pahang towns of Raub and Kuala Lipis and also Kelantan's district of Gua Musang.

Coal is mostly concentrated in Sarawak town of Kapit, Mukah and Silantek.

Forestry

Timber can be found in the vast jungles in Malaysia, especially in East Malaysia. Malaysia total exports for timber and other timber products amounted to MYR 23.4 billion in 2007.

Land use
Large areas of land are used as palm oil plantations, rubber plantations, and paddy fields. Malaysia is the largest exporter of palm oil in the world producing 15.8 million tonnes of crude palm oil in 2007. Malaysia is also one of the largest producers and exporters of rubber and other rubber products.

As of 2011, the percentage arable land in Malaysia is 5.44%. Croplands consists of 17.49% while other land uses consists of 77.07%. As of 2009, irrigated land covers 3,800 km2.  Total renewable water resource total 580 cubic km as of 2011.

Human geography

Peninsular Malaysia is more populated than East Malaysia where 79.2% of the population lives in the Peninsular. In 2002, 59% of Malaysian population lived in urban areas, while the rest live in rural areas. The largest city is Kuala Lumpur with a population of 1.89 million people in the city, and about 7 million in the metropolitan area known as Klang Valley. Other major cities include George Town, Ipoh, Johor Bahru, Kuching, and Kota Kinabalu.

Political geography

Malaysia is divided into thirteen states and three Federal Territories. Eleven states and two Federal Territories are found in Peninsular Malaysia. While two states and one Federal Territory are found in East Malaysia. The states are further divided into administrative districts. In Sabah and Sarawak, they are first divided into divisions, then further divided into districts. There are separate subdivisions for electoral districts for polling purposes.

International borders between Malaysia and Indonesia, Thailand, Singapore and Brunei are defined mostly by geological features such as the Perlis River and Golok River between Malaysia and Thailand; Straits of Johor between Malaysia and Singapore; and Pagalayan Canal between Malaysia and Brunei. However, borders that extends to the seas are defined by agreements such as Straits Settlement and Johore Territorial Waters Agreement of 1927 which defines Malaysia and Singapore water borders.

Border disputes
Malaysia's land borders are well established. The border with Thailand was established in 1909 when Siam ceded Kedah, Kelantan, Perlis and Terengganu to the British. Maritime border disputes between Brunei and Malaysia and a Bruneian claim on Limbang, Sarawak were resolved in an exchange of letters between the two countries on 16 March 2009 after 20 years of negotiations.

Malaysia and Indonesia have some overlapping maritime claims, notably in the area around Sabah. An ongoing series of meetings to resolve these claims has produced 16 border agreements (to September 2010). Malaysia and Singapore also have disputes concerning some maritime borders.

The Philippines has a dormant claim to the eastern part of the Malaysian state of Sabah. Malaysia is also involved in a dispute involving Vietnam, Brunei, the People's Republic of China, the Philippines, and the Republic of China (Taiwan), concerning the Spratly Islands in the South China Sea.

See also
 Environment of Malaysia

References

External links

 Map of Malaysia
 Large map of Malaysia
 Physical Map of Malaysia

 

bn:মালয়েশিয়া#ভূগোল